Miguel Purcell (born 26 September 1962) is a Chilean alpine skier. He competed in three events at the 1984 Winter Olympics.

References

1962 births
Living people
Chilean male alpine skiers
Olympic alpine skiers of Chile
Alpine skiers at the 1984 Winter Olympics
Sportspeople from Santiago
20th-century Chilean people